Birds described in 1860 include glittering kingfisher, northern cassowary, white-throated whistler, Knysna warbler, orange-breasted fruiteater, snowy-throated kingbird, Ecuadorian piedtail, azure dollarbird, 
George Newbold Lawrence, Spencer Fullerton Baird and John Cassin, co-author Birds of North America 
Jacob Henry Studer begins studying the birds of Ohio.
1860 Oxford evolution debate
Alfred Brehm undertakes an expedition to Norway and Lapland
Johann Jakob von Tschudi publishes Reise durch die Andes von Südamerika
Expeditions

1857–1860 SMS Novara Ornithology directed by  Johann Zelebor.

Ongoing events
John Gould The birds of Australia; Supplement 1851–69. 1 vol. 81 plates; Artists: J. Gould and H. C. Richter; Lithographer: H. C. Richter
John Gould The birds of Asia; 1850-83 7 vols. 530 plates, Artists: J. Gould, H. C. Richter, W. Hart and J. Wolf; Lithographers:H. C. Richter and W. Hart
The Ibis

References

Bird
Birding and ornithology by year